Bjarne Eltang (born 27 July 1960 in Odense) is a Danish rower.  Eltang won the world rowing championships in the lightweight single in 1983 and 1984.  
In 1986 he won the Diamond Challenge Sculls at Henley, defeating Steve Redgrave in the final.   Later that year Eltang lost by 0.02 seconds to Peter Antonie of Australia in the world championships lightweight singles final, taking Silver.

In the 1988 Summer Olympics Eltang qualified for the open men's double sculls final, with Per Rasmussen, but did not medal.

References 

 
 

1960 births
Living people
Danish male rowers
Sportspeople from Odense
Olympic rowers of Denmark
Rowers at the 1988 Summer Olympics
World Rowing Championships medalists for Denmark